A sore loser is someone who complains or blames others for their loss, exhibiting poor sportsmanship.

Sore Loser may also refer to:

 "Sore Loser", a song from Tierra Whack's 2018 album Whack World
 "Sore Loser", a 2019 song by KennyHoopla
 The Sore Losers, a Belgian rock band

See also
 Sore loser law, in United States politics